Shah Inayatullah (1655–1718), popularly known as Sufi Shah Inayat Shaheed, Shah Shaheed or Shah Inayat of Jhok, was a 17th-century revolutionary from Jhok, Sindh. He was the first socialist and agricultural reformist of Sindh.

He was executed on the order of Mughal Emperor Farrukhsiyar in the early eighteenth century. Sufi Inayat was accused of leading a small army of peasants (Harees) to challenge the domination of Farrukhsiyar, local feudal landlords, and Mullahs. His mantra, “Jo Kherray so Khaey”, means, "The one who plows has the foremost right on the yield." His popularity forced the feudal landlords to contact Farrukhsiyar, who ordered the ruler of northern Sindh Mian Yar Muhammad Kalhoro to uproot Inayat and his companions. A prolonged siege of Jhok resulted in an offer of negotiations from the Kalhora commander. Sufi Inayat accepted the offer to avoid further bloodshed, but was instead arrested and later executed in Thatto.,

Early life 
Shah Inayat was born in 1655/56 A.D in Miranpur, Sindh near Jhok where Thatta-Tando Mohammad Khan-Hyderabad road stands in modern times. His father Makhdum Fazlullah provided his early education. He travelled the subcontinent to find a spiritual guide (murshid). He arrived in Burhanpur and became initiated into the Qadiriyya order. He travelled to Bijapur and from there to Delhi. In Bijapur, he was a disciple of Shah Abdul Malik ibn Shah Ubaidullah Jilani Qadiri. When his learning was complete, he took leave from his murshid. Before his departure, Shah Abdul Malik placed four things before his disciple: a tasbeeh, a prayer mat, a karaa, and a sword. Shah Inayat chose the sword (a symbol of martyrdom), to which his murshid asked: 'O fakir what price will you pay for this gift?' He replied: "The price is my head."

Influence
Once back in Miranpur, Shah Inayat spent his days in meditation and prayer. He had inherited a vast tract of land from his ancestors near his hometown. His message was one of love, tolerance, and equality. Peasants left their respective lands to join his commune to work for Shah Inayat as he had organized collective farming on his own lands. He had raised the slogan, "One who tills the land should eat [the crop]".

He established a monastery (khangah) at Miranpur and distributed his land among the landless tillers (harees). He expressed opposition to the landlords (zamindar) as well as orthodox theologians. He attracted many followers among the peasantry, and organized them against the rulers, landlords and religious scholars, urging them not to pay agriculture tax to the rulers or give a share of their produce to the landlords. The landlords and orthodox mullahs then aligned against him and complained to Azam Khan, governor of Thatta Sarkar that Shah Inayat was trying to overthrow the government.

Battle of Jhok
Shah Inayat's rising influence among his followers in the area of lower Sindh (Thatta Sarkar) caused much discontent in Yar Muhammad Kalhoro, the feudal lord. The latter enjoyed political sway over Bakhar Sarkar (Northern Sindh) and Sehwan Sarkar (Central Sindh) and thus wanted to control over Thatta Sarkar which was still under the rule of Mughal Nawabs. Kalhoro, the first ruler of Kalhora dynasty, strove to consolidate his power across Sindh, but found the social movement of Sufi Shah Inayat a hurdle in realizing his ambition. Thus he, along with other influential landlords, and Pirs of Dargah succeeded in persuading the Delhi government to act against Shah Inayat and his followers for their rebellion against the Mughal Empire. A battle was launched on Farrukhsiyar's order with the combined forces of Kalhora Chief and the Mughal army of governor of Thatta.

The Battle of Jhok was a clash between the Mughal forces along with their local rulers and a band of Sufis who chose to revolt against the feudal and imperial order of the day. A siege was laid to the town of Jhok for about four months, but Shah Inayat's followers gave a stiff resistance. Shah Inayat was preparing to attack the invaders on 1 January 1718 AD, when the Kalhora chief sent Shahdad Khan Talpur with the Quran to invite Shah Inayat for peace talks. However, when Shah Inayat met Yar Muhammad Kalhoro for talks, he was arrested, brought to Thatta and presented to the Mughal governor.

See also
 Mir Janullah Shah
 Shah Abdul Latif Bhittai
 Rohal Faqir
 Qadir Bux Bedil
 Shah Inayat Rizvi
 Shah Inayat Qadiri
 Túpac Amaru II

References

External links
 Sufi Shah Inayat Shaheed

History of Sindh
Sindhi people
Mughal Empire Sufis
Sufis of Sindh
Sufism in Sindh
Sufi mystics
People from Thatta District
1655 births
1718 deaths